Ross Clarkston Mathie (born 13 November 1946) is a Scottish football former player and coach.

Mathie played for Cambuslang Rangers, Kilmarnock, Dumbarton, Berwick Rangers, Falkirk and Shotts Bon Accord.

He later coached the Scotland under-17 team. Mathie left his post as Scotland under-17 coach in August 2011 and retired in November 2011.

References 

1946 births
Living people
Scottish footballers
Scottish football managers
Association football forwards
Scottish Football League players
Cambuslang Rangers F.C. players
Kilmarnock F.C. players
Dumbarton F.C. players
Berwick Rangers F.C. players
Falkirk F.C. players
Shotts Bon Accord F.C. players